Elm Creek is a stream in the U.S. state of Missouri. It is a tributary of the Salt River.

Elm Creek was named for the elm trees on its course.

See also
List of rivers of Missouri

References

Rivers of Audrain County, Missouri
Rivers of Monroe County, Missouri
Rivers of Missouri